Hippasa is a genus of wolf spiders in the family Lycosidae, first described by Eugène Simon in 1885.

Species
 it contains twenty-seven species:
 Hippasa affinis Lessert, 1933 — Angola
 Hippasa agelenoides (Simon, 1884) — Pakistan, India, Myanmar
 Hippasa albopunctata Thorell, 1899 — Cameroon, Ivory Coast
 Hippasa australis Lawrence, 1927 — Southern Africa
 Hippasa bifasciata Buchar, 1997 — Bhutan
 Hippasa brechti Alderweireldt & Jocqué, 2005 — Ivory Coast, Togo
 Hippasa decemnotata Simon, 1910 — West Africa
Hippasa deserticola Simon, 1889 — Egypt, Middle East, Central Asia
 Hippasa elienae Alderweireldt & Jocqué, 2005 — Kenya, Tanzania, South Africa
 Hippasa flavicoma Caporiacco, 1935 — Karakorum
 Hippasa funerea Lessert, 1925 — Southern Africa
 Hippasa haryanensis Arora & Monga, 1994 — India
 Hippasa himalayensis Gravely, 1924 — India
 Hippasa holmerae Thorell, 1895 — Asia
 Hippasa holmerae sundaica Thorell, 1895 — Singapore
 Hippasa innesi Simon, 1889 — Egypt
 Hippasa lamtoensis Dresco, 1981 — Ivory Coast
 Hippasa lingxianensis Yin & Wang, 1980 — China, Japan
 Hippasa loundesi Gravely, 1924 — India
 Hippasa lycosina Pocock, 1900 — India, China, Laos
 Hippasa madraspatana Gravely, 1924 — India
 Hippasa marginata Roewer, 1960 — Cameroon
 Hippasa olivacea (Thorell, 1887) — Myanmar, India
 Hippasa pantherina Pocock, 1899 — India, Sri Lanka, Nepal, Bangladesh
 Hippasa partita (O. Pickard-Cambridge, 1876) — Africa
 Hippasa simoni (Thorell, 1887) — Myanmar
 Hippasa valiveruensis Patel & Reddy, 1993 — India

References

Lycosidae
Araneomorphae genera
Spiders of Africa
Spiders of Asia